Pag-asa is a Tagalog language word meaning "hope". It may refer to:
 PAGASA, Philippine Atmospheric, Geophysical and Astronomical Services Administration
 Pag-asa, Bohol- one of the 44 barangays of the municipality of Ubay, in the Philippines province of Bohol
 Pag-asa (eagle), the name given to the first of the breed "Philippine eagle" to be bred and hatched in captivity
 Pag-asa, the Philippine name of Thitu Island, one of the Spratly Islands in the South China Sea

See also
Pagasa (disambiguation)